Masdevallia nidifica is a species of orchid found from Central America into northern Peru.

References

External links 

nidifica
Orchids of Central America
Orchids of Peru